The Douglas City Hall is the historic city hall located at 130 S. Third St. in Douglas, Wyoming. The building was constructed from 1915 to 1916 to serve as Douglas' center of government. Architect William Norman Bowman, who also designed the Weld County Courthouse in Greeley, Colorado, designed the building in the Georgian Revival style. The brick building's design features a broken pediment over its front entrance supported by pilasters. The building includes a room on the second floor designed to house meetings of local civic groups; the Douglas Good Roads Club, which later became the Chamber of Commerce, was the first group to use the room extensively. The Douglas government moved out of the building in 1989, and it is now a commercial property.

The building was added to the National Register of Historic Places on March 17, 1994.

References

External links

City and town halls on the National Register of Historic Places in Wyoming
Georgian Revival architecture in Wyoming
Buildings and structures in Converse County, Wyoming
Government buildings completed in 1916
National Register of Historic Places in Converse County, Wyoming
City and town halls in Wyoming